PESCO may refer to:
 Permanent Structured Cooperation, a European Union defence pact
 Peshawar Electric Supply Company, a Pakistan energy company situated in Peshawar

Pesco may also refer to:

 Pesco (Fuscaldo), Fuscaldo, a civil parish in Calabria, Italy
 Joseph del Pesco (born 1975), American contemporary art curator
 Paul Pesco (born 1959), American guitarist

See also
 Pesca (disambiguation)
 Pesche, a municipality of the Province of Isernia, Molise, Italy